Boeberoides is a monotypic genus of flowering plants in the family Asteraceae. It contains only one known species, Boeberoides grandiflora. It is endemic to Mexico (states of Guerrero, Morelos, México).

References

Tageteae
Monotypic Asteraceae genera
Endemic flora of Mexico